Larry Welsh, also known as Lakim Shabazz is a former hip-hop emcee artist who was one of the founding members of the original version of the Flavor Unit crew. His stage name refers to the so-called Lost Tribe of Shabazz, which is based on the teachings of Wallace Fard Muhammad.

Career 
As an artist signed with Tuff City, Lakim first gained recognition when he provided vocals for the 45 King's "The 900 Number". Further collaboration with the 45 King was to follow with the EP titled The Red, The Black, the Green. Then later, in 1988, his debut album Pure Righteousness was released as an introduction-style album with a "the 45 King presents" moniker on the cover sleeve. This album was relatively well received, and has become an iconic release of the period in hip hop where the Nation of Gods and Earths style of the late 1980s/early 1990s is concerned. Shabazz released two albums, recorded for Aaron Fuchs's Tuff City Records, featuring production by The 45 King, and his militant lyrics were predominantly about his love of the Nation of Islam, and his dedication to the Nation of Gods and Earths, the latter of which he was a member. After his second album, he worked with Diamond D briefly before exiting the music industry.

He lives in New Jersey and makes occasional appearances at Five-Percenter Show and Prove events.

In 2015, Shabazz was featured on the Shady Corps' track "Lost Souls".

Influences 
In an interview with AllHipHop, Lakim said, "I came up listening to Cold Crush, Treacherous Three, Jazzy Five. A lot of my influences were, like, Grandmaster Flash, Kool Moe Dee; then later on in life, you had Rakim, Kane".

In the song "Rap God," Eminem called Lakim Shabazz a rap personality who influenced him.

Discography

Singles
 "Pure Righteousness" (1988)
 "Black is Back" (1988)

Albums
 Pure Righteousness (1988)
 The Lost Tribe of Shabazz (1990) (No. 78 on the Top R&B/Hip-Hop Albums)

References

External links

Living people
Five percenters
American rappers
Rappers from New Jersey
20th-century American rappers
20th-century African-American musicians
1968 births